Enrique Alberto Kistenmacher (4 April 1923 – 11 February 1990) was an Argentine decathlete.

At the 1948 Summer Olympics he finished fourth in decathlon  and tenth in long jump. He became South American decathlon champion in 1947 and 1949. In long jump he became South American champion in 1949 and won the bronze medal in 1947.

References

External links
 

1923 births
1990 deaths
Argentine male long jumpers
Argentine decathletes
Athletes (track and field) at the 1948 Summer Olympics
Olympic athletes of Argentina
Argentine people of German descent
Place of birth missing
20th-century Argentine people